The following is a timeline of the history of the city of Shreveport, Louisiana, USA.

19th century

 1836 – Shreve Town Company organized; named for Henry Miller Shreve, one of its members.
 1837 – Shreve Town Company begins selling plots of land.
 1838 – Shreve Town becomes seat of newly formed Caddo Parish.
 1839
 Town of Shreveport incorporated.
 John Octavius Sewall elected mayor.
 1841 – Caddo Gazette newspaper begins publication.
 1847 – Burial ground established.
 1850
 Population: 1,728.
 Brewer's Hall built (approximate date).
 1852 – South-Western newspaper begins publication.
 1853 – Yellow fever outbreak.
 1858 – Vicksburg, Shreveport and Texas Railroad begins operating.
 1860 – Population: 2,190.
 1861 – St. Mary's Convent founded.
 1863 – Shreveport designated Louisiana Confederate capital (until 1865).
 1866 – Charity Hospital established.
 1870 – Population: 4,607.
 1871
 Shreveport becomes a city.
 Daily Shreveport Times newspaper begins publication.
 Crisp's Gaiety Theater built.
 1873
 Dallas-Shreveport railway in operation.
 Yellow fever outbreak.
 1879 – Shreveport Daily Standard newspaper begins publication.
 1880
 First Presbyterian Church built.
 Population: 8,009.
 1886 – Grand Opera House built.
 1887 – Shreveport Waterworks Pumping Station built.
 1890
 Shreveport Library Association formed.
 Population: 11,979.
 1895 – Evening Judge newspaper in publication.
 1896 – Holy Trinity Catholic Church rebuilt.
 1899 – Genevieve Orphanage established.
 1900 – Population: 16,013.

20th century

 1901 – People's Library established.
 1902 – Shreveport Journal newspaper in publication.
 1905 – Agudath Achim Synagogue dedicated.
 1906 – Oil discovered at Caddo Lake in vicinity of Shreveport.
 1907 – Nearby Bossier City incorporated.
 1909 – Centenary College of Louisiana relocated to Shreveport from Jackson.
 1910
 Schumpert Memorial Hospital and Chamber of Commerce established.
 Population: 28,015.
 1912 – United States Post Office and Courthouse built.
 1915 – Traffic Street Bridge built.
 1920 – Population: 43,874.
 1922
 Shreveport Art Club active.
 Shriners Hospitals for Children opened.
 1923 – Public library built.
 1925 – Strand Theatre built.
 1926
 KWKH radio begins broadcasting.
 Caddo Parish courthouse built.
 1927 – Dodd College established.
 1928
 KRMD and KTBS radio begin broadcasting.
 Woman's Auxiliary to the Shreveport Medical Society formed.
 1929 – Shreveport Municipal Memorial Auditorium built.
 1930
 East Texas Oil Field discovered in vicinity of Shreveport.
 Population: 76,655.
 1931 – Shreveport Downtown Airport begins operating.
 1933 – U.S. military Barksdale Airfield dedicated.
 1934 – Long–Allen Bridge opens.
 1935 – Rodessa oil field discovered in vicinity of Shreveport.
 1940 – Population: 98,167.
 1948
 U.S. military Barksdale Air Force Base active.
 KWKH's Louisiana Hayride radio programme begins broadcast.
 1950
 Shreveport metropolitan area was started
 Population: 127,206.
 1952 – North Louisiana Historical Association established.
 1954 - KSLA-TV (television) begins broadcasting.
 1955 - KTBS-TV (television) begins broadcasting.
 1960
 Shreveport metropolitan area Added Bossier Parish
 Population: 164,372.
 1965 - LSU Health Sciences Center Shreveport opened.
 1967 – Louisiana State University in Shreveport opens.
 1970 – Population: 182,064.
 1972 – Quail Creek Cinema in business.
 1973 - Shreveport metropolitan area Added Webster Parish
 1977 – Pioneer Heritage Center and Spring Street Historical Museum founded.
 1980 – Population: 205,820.
 1981 – General Motors plant begins operating in Shreveport.
 1983 - Shreveport metropolitan area Removed Webster Parish
 1986
 Roman Catholic Diocese of Shreveport established.
 Commercial National Bank Tower (hi-rise) built.
 1988 – Jim McCrery becomes U.S. representative for Louisiana's 4th congressional district.
 1990 – Population: 198,525.
 1993 - Shreveport metropolitan area Redded Webster Parish
 1994
 Stephens African American Museum founded.
 Harrah's casino built.
 1998
 Keith Hightower becomes mayor.
 City website online (approximate date).

21st century

 2003
 Shreveport – Bossier City metropolitan area Replaced Webster Parish to De Soto Parish
 2004 – Convention Center built.
 2006 – Cedric Glover becomes first African-American in city elected mayor.
 2009 – John Fleming becomes U.S. representative for Louisiana's 4th congressional district.
 2010 – Population: 199,311.
 2014 – Ollie Tyler becomes first African-American woman in city elected mayor.

See also
 History of Shreveport, Louisiana
 List of mayors of Shreveport, Louisiana
 National Register of Historic Places listings in Caddo Parish, Louisiana
 Other cities in Louisiana:
 Timeline of Baton Rouge, Louisiana
 Timeline of New Orleans

References

Bibliography

published in 19th century
 
 
 
 

published in 20th century
 
 
 
  + Chronology
 
 

published in 21st century

External links
 Items related to Shreveport, various dates (via Digital Public Library of America).

 
Shreveport, Louisiana
Shreveport, Louisiana
Years in Louisiana